Städtische Galerie im Park Viersen is the municipal art gallery of Viersen in North Rhine-Westphalia, Germany. It has a collection of graphic reproductions. The gallery is located in an old town house, surrounded by a park with huge old trees housing the Viersen sculpture collection.

The building
The building was constructed in 1869 as representative neo-renaissance townhouse and became the property of the firm Kaisers Kaffeegeschäft in 1899, who had its headquarters in Viersen. Since 1973 this fine villa belongs to the city of Viersen. In 1976 it became listed as important example of the architecture of its time, in 1980 it was moderately  remodeled for use as an art gallery, which opened up in 1981 as Städtische Galerie im Park for exhibitions as well as other cultural events. It is located right in the centre of town close to a new group of buildings housing the district administration, the so-called Forum and the central bus station.

The collections
The Galerie im Park houses several collections, one of which is the important collection already started in the beginning of the sixties by the then head of the cities administrative staff van Kaldenkerken called Grafische Sammlung i.e. graphic collection.

The exhibitions
The high quality of the exhibitions taking place several times a year attracts visitors from the lower Rhine area as well as the Netherlands. The first exhibition in 1981 showed works by the realist painter Dieter Asmus, followed by ones showing diverse styles up to kinetic art by Günter Haese (2007). The most outstanding artists whose exhibitions where often accompanied by special publications, were for example Christoph Meckel (1987), Hermann Schmitz<ref>Angelika Pack: Hermann Schmitz. Ein rheinischer Maler. Viersen 1987</ref> (1987), Henry Moore (1989), Erwin Heerich (1990), Tony Cragg (1996), Lothar-Günther Buchheim (1997), Anatol (2002), Roberto Matta (2002), Georg Ettl (2003), Ewald Mataré (2004), ZEBRA (2005), Martin Lersch (2006), Günter Haese (2007) and Wang Du (2010).

Other activities
Besides readings by authors and concerts the municipal gallery offers an educational program with guided tours for schools and other groups. A special event is always the guided snoop-tour at lunch time on the first Tuesday of each month, which casts a spotlight on a few chosen objects of the current exhibition.

Secondary literature
 Werner Mellen: Städtische Galerie im Park Viersen. Die wechselvolle Geschichte des Hauses. In: Albert Pauly (editor). Viersen – Beiträge zu einer Stadt. Vol. 4. Viersen 1983
 Angelika Pack, Helmut Heißenbüttel: 10 Jahre Städtische Galerie im Park Viersen. Kulturamt der Stadt Viersen 1992
 Jutta Pitzen: Die Graphische Sammlung der Stadt Viersen''. Vol. 1-4. Editor: Stadt Viersen, Fachbereich Schule, Kultur und Sport. Viersen 1996/97

External links
 Städtische Galerie im Park Viersen on the Website of Viersen
 Städtische Galerie im Park Viersen on Facebook

Notes

Art museums and galleries in Germany
1981 establishments in West Germany
Culture of North Rhine-Westphalia
Museums in North Rhine-Westphalia
Art museums established in 1981
Buildings and structures in Viersen (district)